Better Than I Used to Be is the title of the ninth studio album by American country music artist Sammy Kershaw. The album was released on August 31, 2010 via Big Hit Records. It is produced by Buddy Cannon. Two singles were released from the album: "Better Than I Used to Be" and "The Snow White Rows of Arlington". The album, along with the two singles, failed to enter a Billboard chart.

"Saltwater Cowboy" was originally recorded by Tracy Byrd on his 2006 album Different Things.
A cover song of "The Cover of the Rolling Stone" featuring Jamey Johnson was also included on the album.

A music video was made for "Better Than I Used to Be" and was directed by David Abbott. "Better Than I Used to Be" was later covered by Tim McGraw on his 2012 album Emotional Traffic.

Critical reception
Better Than I Used to Be generated positive reviews overall. Giving the album three and a half stars out of five, Matt Bjorke of  Roughstock said that Better Than I Used To Be finds Sammy Kershaw in a great place." and states that "with 11 strong tunes Better Than I Used To Be reminds us exactly why Sammy Kershaw is still considered one of country music’s best vocalists." 
Eric Banister of Country Standard Time gave a favorable review, "On his first new album in four years, Kershaw nearly lives up to the title, displaying a voice that is as strong as it has ever been."

Track listing

Personnel

 Wyatt Beard – background vocals
 Mark Beckett – drums
 Buddy Cannon – background vocals
 Melonie Cannon – background vocals
 Scotty Emerick – acoustic guitar
 Sonny Garrish – steel guitar, background vocals
 Kevin "Swine" Grantt – bass guitar
 Kenny Greenberg – electric guitar
 Rob Hajacos – fiddle
 Tim Hensley – background vocals
 John Hobbs – piano, Wurlitzer
 Jamey Johnson – vocals on "The Cover of the Rolling Stone"
 Sammy Kershaw – lead vocals
 Troy Lancaster – electric guitar
 Randy McCormick – Hammond B-3 organ, piano, synthesizer
 Willie McKee – background vocals
 Larry Paxton – bass guitar
 Hugh Prestwood – acoustic guitar, synthesizer
 Mickey Raphael – harmonica
 Bobby Terry – acoustic guitar

References

External links
[ Better Than I Used To Be] at Allmusic

2010 albums
Albums produced by Buddy Cannon
Sammy Kershaw albums